Krasa is a rural locality (a selo) in Zhitninsky Selsoviet, Ikryaninsky District, Astrakhan Oblast, Russia. The population was 105 as of 2010. There is 1 street.

Geography 
Krasa is located 45 km south of Ikryanoye (the district's administrative centre) by road. Zhitnoye is the nearest rural locality.

References 

Rural localities in Ikryaninsky District